Vladislav Mirković (Cyrillic: Владислав Мирковић; born 26 March 1975) is a Montenegrin retired footballer.

Club career
During his career, he played as forward and represented the following clubs: FK Mogren, FK Jedinstvo Paraćin, FK Rudar Pljevlja, Australian Carlton SC, Red Star Belgrade and FK Bežanija.

Honours
Red Star
First League of FR Yugoslavia: 1999-00, 2000-01
FR Yugoslavia Cup: 1999, 2000

External sources
 Profile and stats at Srbijafudbal
 

1975 births
Living people
People from Budva
Serbia and Montenegro footballers
Association football forwards
FK Mogren players
FK Rudar Pljevlja players
Carlton S.C. players
Red Star Belgrade footballers
FK Bežanija players
OFK Beograd players
First League of Serbia and Montenegro players
National Soccer League (Australia) players
Serbia and Montenegro expatriate footballers
Expatriate soccer players in Australia
Serbia and Montenegro expatriate sportspeople in Australia